Colonel Sir John Luke Lowther  (17 November 1923 – 11 April 2011) was a British soldier and Northamptonshire gentleman.

Family
Lowther was the son of Col. John George Lowther, who in turn was a younger brother of Sir Charles Lowther, 4th Baronet. 

He married Jennifer Jane Bevan in 1952, by whom he had three children:
Sarah Charlotte Margaret Lowther (b. 1954), married Henry Merton Henderson in 1977 and had issue
Hugh William Lowther (b. 1956), married Hon. Amanda Vivian in 1985 and had issue
Lavinia Mary "Lucy" Lowther (b. 1958), married Julian Edward Tomkins in 1983 and had issue

Career
Lowther was commissioned a second lieutenant in the King's Royal Rifle Corps on 6 March 1943.

Lowther stood as Conservative candidate for Belper in the general elections of 1964 and 1966, but on both occasions was defeated by the incumbent MP, George Brown. 

In 1971, Lowther was appointed High Sheriff of Northamptonshire. He received a deputy lieutenant's commission in 1977, and in 1984, he was appointed Lord Lieutenant of the county. While serving as Lord Lieutenant in 1986, he became Honorary Colonel of the Royal Anglian Regiment, Northampton Territorial Army battalion, an appointment he held until 1989, following which he received the honorary rank of colonel.

He was made a KCVO in the 1997 New Year Honours, and stepped down as Lord Lieutenant in 1998.

References

1923 births
2011 deaths
Commanders of the Order of the British Empire
High Sheriffs of Northamptonshire
King's Royal Rifle Corps officers
Knights Commander of the Royal Victorian Order
Lord-Lieutenants of Northamptonshire
Conservative Party (UK) parliamentary candidates